Charles Henry Land (1847–1922) was a dentist who pioneered porcelain and gold teeth crowns. His brother, John Christian Lodge (1862–1950), was the 51st, 54th, and 56th mayor of Detroit. Dr Land was the grandfather of famed aviator Charles Lindbergh (1902–1974).

Personal life 
Land was born in Ontario, Canada on January 11, 1847. On April 28, 1875, he married Evangeline Lodge (1850–1919). They had two children: Evangeline Lodge Land Lindbergh (1876–1954) and Charles H. Land II (1881–1961). Dr Land is known as the father of porcelain and gold crowns.  In 1889, he patented the platinum foil matrix for porcelain jacket crowns. His New-York Tribune obituary credits him as the inventor of the gold and porcelain inlay system. Land practiced dentistry for 58 years.

References

External links 

  Charles Lindbergh House and Museum
 The Charles A. Lindbergh and Family Papers are available for research use at the Minnesota Historical Society.

1847 births
1922 deaths
Lindbergh family
People from Detroit
American dentists
People from Ontario
American inventors
Aviation pioneers